Hayfork may refer to:
Pitchfork, a tool that farmers use to manually move hay
Hay fork (machine), the grapple device used together with ropes and pulleys to move hay from a hay wagon to a haystack in a barn loft
Hayfork, California, a census-designated place in Trinity County, California